Luke Paris (born 11 November 1994) is a professional footballer who plays as a defender for Uxbridge. Born in England, he represents the Anguilla national team.

Career
Paris made his senior international debut on 5 September 2019 in a 10–0 defeat to Guatemala during the CONCACAF Nations League.

Personal life
His cousin Calvin Morgan also plays for Anguilla.

Career statistics

References

External links

Living people
1996 births
English people of Anguillan descent
Anguillan footballers
Association football defenders
Anguilla international footballers
Windsor F.C. players